Portrait of Fortunato Bartolomeo de Felice is a painting by an unknown artist, probably completed between 1750 and 1765. The portrait was commissioned by Fortunato Bartolomeo De Felice himself, an Italian count and Enlightenment figure.

The portrait is one of few in existence and most fully representative work of de Felice.

The painting

Description
The current holder of the portrait, the de Felice Duchi Estate, puts this painting as the best representation of de Felice in existence. It is composed of oil paint on canvas, and an elaborate gold frame. The portrait shows de Felice sitting on a red chair, beside a large red bookcase filled with books.

It is a semi-profile half-portrait of a poised, mid-speech de Felice. It seems he is at the beginning of writing a letter which could be representative of his extensive correspondence across Europe. Unfortunately, it is too obscure to make out the writing on the letters on his desk. He appears well-fed; his tightly buttoned jacket and slight double chin accentuate this.

In a contrast to his austere jacket, white frills protrude at his wrist and he wears a black velvet turban. The turban is perhaps a reference to his cultured life, and the turban was becoming increasingly fashionable during the 18th Century as connections to India grew. However, there is no record of de Felice having ever visited India during his lifetime.

He has blue eyes under rather heavy lids, a strong Roman nose and a hint of a mustache growing.

All the interior elements match in this paintings; the red curtain that reveals the figure, the red ornately carved bookshelf, his red armchair and his red desk. The background however is split into two halves. The left containing the bookshelf and a cream-coloured section. The right hand side is a matte black, contrasting with the navy blue of his jacket and the rich velvet of his turban.

Symbolism
It is not known if there is any significance to the middle three buttons his jacket being undone. It is also of note that as such his jacket's buttons are in order of 2, 3 and 4 buttons.

Set amongst the black background is a heraldic symbol, which is not the de Felice coat of arms. It is at present unknown what it represents. It is two-thirds red; the other third is a white strip and black plume. It has been suggested that it might be the insignia of the Bern Typographical Society of which he was President.

Notes
It is assumed that this portrait was painted at a similar time to that of his second wife, Susanne Catherine de Wavre. If the two portraits were painted at the same time, it is curious that de Felice's portrait is a great deal more rigid than de Wavre's which is practically Rococo in style.

References

1760 paintings